We Make Music is a 1942 German musical comedy film directed by Helmut Käutner, starring Ilse Werner, Viktor de Kowa and Edith Oß.

Plot
It is a revue film, loosely based on the stage work Karl III. und Anna von Österreich by Manfried Rössner. Karl Zimmermann, a composer whose idols are Johann Sebastian Bach and classical composers, dreams of being successful with his own opera and composes popular music for fun, but does not try to distribute it for reasons of honor. His wife, Anni Pichler is a popular singer and secretly sells his popular songs so that they can make a living. When he finally completes his opera and it is rejected by the public, he realizes that his true talent is composing popular music and not dishonorable.

Cast

References

External links

1942 musical comedy films
German musical comedy films
Films of Nazi Germany
Films directed by Helmut Käutner
Films about composers
Films about singers
Terra Film films
German black-and-white films
1940s German-language films
1940s German films